Erenfried I of Maasgau was the count of Bliesgau, and the count of Charmois (fl. 866–904). He married Adelgunde of Burgundy (860–902), a daughter of Conrad II, Duke of Transjurane Burgundy, Count of Auxerre, and Judith de Frioul.
They left children:

Hermann I, Archbishop of Cologne (890–924), Chancellor of King Zwentibold of Lorraine,
Ermenfried.

Ezzonids
House of Limburg
House of Limburg-Stirum
Counts of Germany
904 deaths
Year of birth unknown